The Most Important People (also known as Mr. and Mrs. Carroll) was a 15-minute musical variety show on the now-defunct DuMont Television Network, hosted by orchestra leader Jimmy Carroll (1913–1972) and his wife Rita Carroll. The show aired Wednesdays and Fridays at 7:30pm EST from October 18, 1950, to April 13, 1951. The title referred to babies, since the sponsor was Gerber's Baby Food.

Episode status
As with most DuMont series, no episodes are known to exist.

See also
List of programs broadcast by the DuMont Television Network
List of surviving DuMont Television Network broadcasts
1950-51 United States network television schedule
List of local children's television series
Happy's Party (1952–53, originated from WDTV in Pittsburgh)
Kids and Company (1951–52)
All About Baby (1953–55, originated from WGN-TV in Chicago)
Playroom (1948)

References

Bibliography
David Weinstein, The Forgotten Network: DuMont and the Birth of American Television (Philadelphia: Temple University Press, 2004) 
Alex McNeil, Total Television, Fourth edition (New York: Penguin Books, 1980) 
Tim Brooks and Earle Marsh, The Complete Directory to Prime Time Network TV Shows, Third edition (New York: Ballantine Books, 1964)

External links
The Most Important People at IMDB
DuMont historical website

DuMont Television Network original programming
1950s American variety television series
1950 American television series debuts
1951 American television series endings
Black-and-white American television shows
Lost television shows